Lemoore Station is a census-designated place (CDP) in Naval Air Station Lemoore, Kings County, California, United States. It is part of the Hanford–Corcoran Metropolitan Statistical Area. The population was 7,438 as of the 2010 United States Census.

Geography
Lemoore Station is located at  (36.260534, -119.891936).

Climate
According to the Köppen Climate Classification system, Lemoore Station has a semi-arid climate, abbreviated "BSk" on climate maps.

Demographics

2010
The 2010 United States Census reported that Lemoore Station had a population of 7,438. The racial makeup of Lemoore Station was 4,883 (65.6%) White, 729 (9.8%) African American, 70 (0.9%) Native American, 560 (7.5%) Asian, 53 (0.7%) Pacific Islander, 418 (5.6%) from other races, and 725 (9.7%) from two or more races. Hispanic or Latino of any race were 1,445 persons (19.4%).

The Census reported that 5,495 people (73.9% of the population) lived in households, 1,923 (25.9%) lived in non-institutionalized group quarters, and 20 (0.3%) were institutionalized.

There were 1,585 households, out of which 1,253 (79.1%) had children under the age of 18 living in them, 1,382 (87.2%) were opposite-sex married couples living together, 133 (8.4%) had a female householder with no husband present, 26 (1.6%) had a male householder with no wife present.  There were 8 (0.5%) unmarried opposite-sex partnerships, and 11 (0.7%) same-sex married couples or partnerships. 37 households (2.3%) were made up of individuals, and 1 (0.1%) had someone living alone who was 65 years of age or older. The average household size was 3.47.  There were 1,541 families (97.2% of all households); the average family size was 3.52.

The population was spread out, with 2,407 people (32.4%) under the age of 18, 2,205 people (29.6%) aged 18 to 24, 2,682 people (36.1%) aged 25 to 44, 130 people (1.7%) aged 45 to 64, and 14 people (0.2%) who were 65 years of age or older.  The median age was 22.5 years. For every 100 females, there were 144.2 males.  For every 100 females age 18 and over, there were 166.8 males.

The homeowner vacancy rate was 0%; the rental vacancy rate was 2.1%.  19 people (0.3% of the population) lived in owner-occupied housing units and 5,476 people (73.6%) lived in rental housing units.

2000
As of the census of 2000, there were 5,749 people, 1,309 households, and 1,286 families residing in the CDP. The racial makeup of the CDP was 61.68% White, 10.96% African American, 1.30% Native American, 9.57% Asian, 0.77% Pacific Islander, 8.94% from other races, and 6.78% from two or more races. Hispanic or Latino of any race were 16.84% of the population.

There were 1,309 households, out of which 80.1% had children under the age of 18 living with them, 92.2% were married couples living together, 3.7% had a female householder with no husband present, and 1.7% were non-families. 1.5% of all households were made up of individuals, and none had someone living alone who was 65 years of age or older.  The average household size was 3.56 and the average family size was 3.56.

In the CDP, the population was spread out, with 35.4% under the age of 18, 26.4% from 18 to 24, 36.7% from 25 to 44, 1.3% from 45 to 64, and 0.2% who were 65 years of age or older.  The median age was 22 years. For every 100 females, there were 138.6 males.  For every 100 females age 18 and over, there were 158.3 males.

The median income for a household in the CDP was $30,449, and the median income for a family was $30,407. Males had a median income of $21,035 versus $20,144 for females. The per capita income for the CDP was $12,682.  About 5.7% of families and 6.3% of the population were below the poverty line, including 7.1% of those under age 18 and none of those age 65 or over.

Politics
In the state legislature, Lemoore Station is located in the 16th Senate District, which is represented by Republican Andy Vidak, and in the 32nd Assembly District, represented by Democrat Rudy Salas. Federally, Hanford is located in California's 21st congressional district and is represented by Republican David Valadao.

Lemoore Station is represented on the Kings County Board of Supervisors by Doug Verboon.

References

Census-designated places in Kings County, California
Lemoore, California
Census-designated places in California